Lovie Lee Smith (born May 8, 1958) is an American football coach. He has served as the head coach of the Chicago Bears, Tampa Bay Buccaneers, and Houston Texans of the NFL, and as the head coach of the Illinois Fighting Illini. Smith has been to the Super Bowl twice, as the defensive coordinator for the St. Louis Rams in 2001 and as head coach for the Bears in 2006.

Early life
Smith was raised in Big Sandy, Texas and won three straight state titles as a star linebacker. He was named after his great aunt, Lavana.

Playing career

High school
During Smith's high school career at Big Sandy, he earned all-state honors for three years as a defensive end and linebacker. His team won three consecutive state championships from 1973 to 1975, including a 0–0 tie in 1974 versus G. A. Moore's Celina. In 1975, Big Sandy had one of the most dominant seasons in high school football history, as the defense allowed only 15 points (11 shutouts) all season, while the offense, featuring eventual Miami Dolphins running back David Overstreet, scored a then-national record 824 points.

College
Smith played college football at University of Tulsa under head coach John Cooper. He was a two-time All-American at linebacker and defensive back.

Coaching career

High school
After graduating from college, he immediately pursued a coaching career. He was hired as defensive coordinator at his alma mater, Big Sandy High School, in 1980. A year later, he left for Cascia Hall Preparatory School in Tulsa in 1981 and 1982, coaching defensive backs and wide receivers.

College assistant coach
In 1983, Smith began coaching linebackers on the college level, first at his alma mater the University of Tulsa (1983–86), and then at University of Wisconsin–Madison (1987), Arizona State University (1988–91), and the University of Kentucky (1992). He also served as defensive backs coach at the University of Tennessee (1993–94), and Ohio State University (1995).

NFL assistant coach
Smith began his NFL coaching career as a linebacker coach for the Tampa Bay Buccaneers. Under the guidance of Tony Dungy, he helped develop the Tampa 2 defense. After spending five years with Buccaneers, Smith was hired as the defensive coordinator of the St. Louis Rams under head coach Mike Martz. While in St. Louis, Smith improved the Rams defense, which went from giving up a league-worst 29.4 points per game in 2000 to an average of 17.1 points in 2001. The Rams won the 2001 NFC Championship and advanced to Super Bowl XXXVI. The team ultimately lost to the New England Patriots in one of the biggest Super Bowl upsets of all time.

Chicago Bears

2004–2010

The Chicago Bears hired Smith as head coach in 2004, following the dismissal of Dick Jauron. Upon arriving in Chicago, Smith stated he had three goals: beat the Green Bay Packers; win the NFC North; and win a Super Bowl. He struggled during his first season with the Bears, as the installation of new offensive and defensive systems and a series of injuries, including a season-ending knee injury to starting quarterback Rex Grossman, contributed to a 5–11 record. Despite their poor offense, the Bears’ defense saw some major improvement, rising from 22nd in 2003 to 13th in 2004.

In 2005, history repeated itself when quarterback Rex Grossman suffered a serious injury during the preseason and missed a majority of the season. Despite Grossman's loss, Smith and Ron Rivera used a dominant defense and the timely play of backup quarterback Kyle Orton to earn an 11–5 record, after starting the season with a 1–3 record. The Bears defense finished second in the league in terms of yardage, while allowing the fewest points in the league.

The Bears’ dramatic turn around in the 2005 season earned Smith national recognition. He won the Associated Press NFL Coach of the Year Award that year.  After returning to the field following their first round bye, the Bears played the Carolina Panthers, with a fully healed Rex Grossman as quarterback. Both the Bears’ offense and defense struggled to keep up with the Panthers, and eventually lost, 29–21.

Smith and the Bears’ management drew criticism in April 2006, by trading away their first round pick and drafting five defensive players. The preseason criticism increased when he named Grossman, who struggled to move the Bears’ offense during the preseason, as the Bears' starting quarterback. Grossman led the Bears to seven consecutive victories, but struggled during the later portion of the season. Smith stood by Grossman, stating "Rex is our quarterback" when questioned by the media.  The Bears finished the 2006 season with a 13–3 record, earning the NFC’s top playoff seed. The Bears finished the season with the NFL's second-ranked scoring offense, and fifth-ranked overall defense.

Smith led the Bears to a 27–24 victory against the defending NFC champion Seattle Seahawks during the 2006 Divisional Playoffs, winning the first playoff game of his career. Later, a 39–14 victory came against the New Orleans Saints at the NFC Championship. Smith became the first Black head coach (and the second minority coach, behind Tom Flores) to lead his team to a Super Bowl, just hours before Indianapolis Colts head coach Tony Dungy, his good friend and mentor, became the second. The friends together became the first two African American head coaches to oppose each other in a Super Bowl. The Bears lost Super Bowl XLI, 29–17.

2007–2012

Following Chicago's successful season, Smith requested a pay raise. The lowest-paid coach in the NFL in 2006 at $1.35 million, Smith would have earned $1.45 million in the final season of a four-year contract. After a stalemate in contract negotiations, the Bears signed Smith to a new four-year contract worth $22 million on March 1. However, he parted with defensive coordinator Ron Rivera, who was not re-signed after his contract expired. Additionally, four other members of Smith's coaching staff also left the team.

In 2007, Smith, confident in Grossman's abilities, named him the team's starting quarterback over Kyle Orton and Brian Griese. After the team started the season with a 1–2 record, Smith announced that Griese would replace Grossman. Griese led the Bears to a 2–3 record, but sustained an injury in a game against the Oakland Raiders, which allowed Grossman to become the team's starting quarterback again. However, Grossman was later injured in the season, and temporarily relieved by Griese. Smith ultimately allowed Kyle Orton to finish the remainder of the season, who led the Bears to a 2–1 record. The team's inconsistency at the quarterback position and failure to establish a proper running game contributed to the team's 7–9 finish. While the team finished last in the NFC North, Smith was pleased that the team ended the season by winning their last two games. Bob Babich, the team's defensive coordinator, was also criticized for his play calling.

The next year, Smith and the Bears parted with their leading rusher Cedric Benson, passer Griese, and receiver Bernard Berrian. Smith declared Kyle Orton as the team's starting quarterback, who started the season with an upset victory over the Indianapolis Colts. The Bears proceeded to go 2–2, with two overtime losses.  The team managed to avoid falling below .500 for the remainder of the season, but missed the playoffs after losing their season finale to the Houston Texans. Smith was pleased with the success of rookie running back Matt Forte and quarterback Kyle Orton, who finished the season with a 79.6 quarterback rating. After the season's conclusion, Smith demoted Babich and took over defensive play calling responsibilities. He was also reunited with his long-time friend, Rod Marinelli, who had lost his head coaching job with the Detroit Lions.

Later in the offseason, Smith and general manager Jerry Angelo had conflicting views on the future of the team's quarterback position. While Smith was content with Orton, Angelo was more interested in creating a long-term solution to the position. Angelo traded Orton and the Bears' 2009 and 2010 first round draft picks for Jay Cutler of the Denver Broncos. The team's high expectations were quickly grounded when the Bears struggled in the month of November, losing four of five games. The Bears were eliminated from the playoff race for the third consecutive year after losing to the Green Bay Packers during a Week 14 matchup. The loss marked the first time that the Bears under Lovie Smith had ever lost two games to Green Bay in a single season.

A week after the loss to Green Bay, it was reported that despite rumors about changes to the Bears coaching staff, Smith would remain the team's head coach. Jerry Angelo, the team's general manager, refused to confirm these reports when addressing the media the following Sunday. Smith finished the season with consecutive wins against the Minnesota Vikings and Detroit Lions. His victory over Detroit marked his 100th game as the team's head coach.

After the season's conclusion, the Bears organization announced that Smith would return in 2010. However, the organization fired offensive coordinator Ron Turner and three other offensive coaches. Turner was replaced by Mike Martz, who had been the head coach of the St. Louis Rams when Smith was their defensive coordinator. Smith was relieved of his defensive play-calling responsibilities, while Babich was officially demoted as the team's defensive coordinator. The Bears would go 11–5, but lost to the Packers in the NFC Championship Game.

In 2011, the Bears went 7–3, but after losing quarterback Jay Cutler to a broken thumb, the Bears lost five straight, a first in Smith's career, and finished 8–8. At the end of the season, general manager Jerry Angelo was fired, and offensive coordinator Mike Martz resigned. Phil Emery, who worked for Smith during the 2004 season as an area scout for the Bears, became the new Bears general manager. Bears offensive line coach Mike Tice replaced Martz at offensive coordinator. In Week 13 of the 2012 season, the Bears recorded their 300th takeaway under Smith.

The Bears started the 2012 season on a promising note with a 7–1 record. The team's defense ranked first in takeaways, third in points allowed, and fifth in yards allowed. However, the team lost five of their next eight games. The Bears finished the season with a 10–6 record, but missed the playoffs for the fifth time in six years. On December 31, 2012, Smith was fired as head coach of the Chicago Bears. Smith departed the Bears with nine years of service, three playoff appearances, one Coach of the Year award, and one Super Bowl appearance. Prior to sitting out the 2013 season, Smith interviewed with the Philadelphia Eagles and Buffalo Bills regarding their head coaching vacancies.

Tampa Bay Buccaneers
Smith was hired as the Tampa Bay Buccaneers' 10th head coach in franchise history on Monday, January 7, 2014. Talking about his first stint with the Buccaneers, Smith said: "We did lay a foundation for Tampa Bay Buccaneer football, there's a certain brand of football that you expected from us. That would be relentless, you play hard, physical, but there was a brand of football that you did get from us each week at Raymond James Stadium. It was hard for opponents to come in and win." Smith also interviewed for the head coaching vacancies held by the Houston Texans and Detroit Lions prior to taking the Buccaneers job.

On January 6, 2016, Smith was fired by the Buccaneers after posting a record of 8–24 in his two years, including a 6–10 record in the 2015 season.

University of Illinois
On March 7, 2016, Smith was named head coach for the University of Illinois, agreeing to a contract paying $21 million over six years. In the 48 hours following the announcement of the Smith hire, the university sold over 2000 new season tickets and more than 400 new student season tickets.

When Smith's contract was approved by the university's Board of Trustees at their September 2016 meeting, $2 million of the salary was moved from the last two years of the contract and made payable in earlier years. Additionally, the contract provided for up to $8 million in performance bonuses.

On October 19, 2019, the Fighting Illini had their most significant win since Smith took over as head coach with a 24–23 upset over then #6 Wisconsin. In 2019, Smith led the Fighting Illini to a 6–6 regular season record and to their first bowl game since 2014. Smith was fired on December 13, 2020, after Illinois started the season with a 2–5 record. He finished with an overall record of 17–39 in five seasons at Illinois, including a 10–33 record in Big Ten Conference play.

Houston Texans
Smith was hired on March 10, 2021, by the Houston Texans as their associate head coach and defensive coordinator under head coach David Culley, marking Smith's first time in the NFL since 2015, when he served as head coach of the Tampa Bay Buccaneers.  In Smith's first season leading the Texans' defense in 2021, Houston recorded 25 total takeaways, tied for 10th in the NFL, while intercepting 3.1% of opponent passing attempts, the fifth-highest rate in the league.

He was promoted to head coach on February 7, 2022. Smith previously interviewed for the Texans' head coaching job back in December 2013 before they hired Penn State head coach and former New England Patriots assistant Bill O'Brien on January 3, 2014.

Smith was fired on January 8, 2023, after the Texans went 3–13–1 in the 2022 season. The firing occurred hours after the Texans won their season finale against the Indianapolis Colts, which cost them the first overall pick in the 2023 NFL Draft, giving the pick to Smith's old team, the Chicago Bears, instead.

Personal life
Lovie and his wife, MaryAnne, have three sons.

Smith, whose mother is blind because of diabetes, is an active supporter of the American Diabetes Association. He and his wife are also the founders of the Lovie and MaryAnne Smith Foundation, a program which provides educational and life skill opportunities to worthy young people who otherwise face barriers in reaching their educational goals. He was the Grand Marshal for the USG Sheetrock 400 NASCAR Nextel Cup Series race at Chicagoland Speedway on July 15, 2007.

Smith is a devout Christian and has contributed every month to Brown's Chapel, his former Methodist church in Texas. In 2012, Smith was inducted into the Texas Sports Hall of Fame, along with Bubba Smith, Dave Parks, Andre Ware, Mack Brown and Fred Couples.

Head coaching record

NFL

College

*Fired after seven games

References

External links

 Illinois profile

1958 births
Living people
American football defensive backs
American football linebackers
Arizona State Sun Devils football coaches
Chicago Bears head coaches
Illinois Fighting Illini football coaches
Houston Texans coaches
Houston Texans head coaches
Kentucky Wildcats football coaches
Ohio State Buckeyes football coaches
St. Louis Rams coaches
Tampa Bay Buccaneers coaches
Tampa Bay Buccaneers head coaches
Tennessee Volunteers football coaches
Tulsa Golden Hurricane football coaches
Tulsa Golden Hurricane football players
Wisconsin Badgers football coaches
National Football League defensive coordinators
High school football coaches in Oklahoma
High school football coaches in Texas
People from Gladewater, Texas
People from Big Sandy, Texas
Coaches of American football from Texas
Players of American football from Texas
African-American coaches of American football
African-American players of American football
African-American Christians
20th-century African-American sportspeople
21st-century African-American sportspeople